The Pocono Mountains, commonly referred to as the Poconos , are a geographical, geological, and cultural region in Northeastern Pennsylvania. They overlook the Delaware River and Delaware Water Gap to the east, Lake Wallenpaupack to the north, Wyoming Valley and the Coal Region to the west, and the Lehigh Valley to the south. The name Pocono is derived from the Munsee word Pokawachne, which means "Creek Between Two Hills". 

Much of the Poconos region lies within the Greater New York–Newark, NY–NJ–CT–PA Combined Statistical Area. The wooded hills and valleys have long been a popular recreation area, accessible within a two-hour drive to millions of metropolitan area residents, with many Pocono communities having resort hotels with fishing, hunting, skiing, and other sports facilities.

The Poconos are an upland of the larger Allegheny Plateau, forming a  escarpment.

Population
The Pocono Mountains are a popular recreational destination for local and regional visitors.  While the area has long been a popular tourist destination, many communities have seen a rise in population, especially communities within Monroe County and Pike County. The region has a population of about 340,300, which is growing at a rapid pace. The Poconos now serves as a commuter community for New York City and northern New Jersey. The commute to workplaces often takes as much as two hours each way due to traffic.

The region lacks a major population center, although there are municipalities such as Stroudsburg, East Stroudsburg, and Mount Pocono. The three towns and the surrounding townships are all located in Monroe County, Pennsylvania, where the population is 165,058, about half of which is in the Poconos.

Municipalities and communities

The Pocono Mountains of northeastern Pennsylvania are divided into six regions: the Mountain Region, the Lake Region, the Delaware River Region, the Upper Delaware River Region, Wyoming Valley, and the Lehigh River Gorge Region.

Mountain Region
Located in Monroe, Luzerne, southern Lackawanna, and northern Carbon Counties:

 Albrightsville
 Barrett Township
 Bartonsville
 Bear Creek
 Blakeslee
 Canadensis
 Chestnuthill Township
 Coolbaugh Township
 Drifton
 Delaware Water Gap
 East Side
 East Stroudsburg
 Foster Township
 Freeland
 Gouldsboro
 Henryville
 Jackson Township
 Jim Thorpe
 Jonas, Pennsylvania
 Kidder Township
 Kunkletown
 Lake Harmony
 Lausanne Township
 Long Pond
 Marshalls Creek
 Middle Smithfield
 Mount Pocono
 Mountainhome
 Packer Township
 Paradise Township
 Penn Forest Township
 Penn Lake Park
 Pocono Lake
 Pocono Pines
 Pocono Summit
 Pocono Township
 Price Township
 Reeders
 Smithfield Township
 Saylorsburg
 Scotrun
 Stroudsburg
 Stroud Township
 Thornhurst
 Weatherly
 White Haven
 Swiftwater
 Tannersville
 Tobyhanna

Lake Region

Located in Pike and Wayne Counties:

 Gouldsboro
 Hawley
 Honesdale
 Lakeville
 Lake Ariel
 Newfoundland
 Tafton
 Tanners Falls

Delaware River Region

Located in Monroe and Pike Counties:
 Eshback
 Milford
Bushkill

Upper Delaware River Region
Located in Pike and Wayne Counties:
 Greeley
 Lackawaxen
 Shohola

Wyoming Valley
Located in Luzerne County:

 Mountaintop
 Dennison Township
 Ashley
 Kingston
 Forty Fort
 Nanticoke
 Wilkes-Barre Township
 Laurel Run
 Sugar Notch
 Dorrance
 Greater Pittston
 Wilkes-Barre
 Nanticoke
 Hanover
 Fairview Township

Outlying areas
The boundary of the region can be at times unclear, and these Lehigh Valley, Carbon County, Schuylkill County, and Greater Hazleton (Luzerne County) communities fall on the periphery of the Poconos:

 Coaldale (Schuylkill County)
 Pen Argyl (Northampton County)
 Bangor (Northampton County)
 Walnutport (Northampton County)
 Macungie (Lehigh County)
 Slatington (Lehigh County)
 Drums (Luzerne County)
 Hazleton (Luzerne County)
 West Hazleton (Luzerne County)
 Aquashicola (Carbon County)
 Andreas (Carbon and Schuylkill Counties)
 Beaver Meadows (Carbon County)
 Ashfield (Carbon County)
 Bowmanstown (Carbon County)
 Forest Inn (Carbon County)
 Lansford (Carbon County)
 Lehighton (Carbon County)
 Nesquehoning (Carbon County)
 Palmerton (Carbon County)
 Parryville (Carbon County)
 Portland (Northampton County)
 Summit Hill (Carbon County)
 Tamaqua (Schuylkill County)
 Weissport (Carbon County)

Transportation

Roads

The Poconos Region is served by many state highways. The most used of these highways include Pennsylvania Route 115, Pennsylvania Route 715, Pennsylvania Route 903 (designated in some areas as the "Highway to Adventure" because of the numerous venues and resorts along the highway), Pennsylvania Route 33, Pennsylvania Route 940, and Pennsylvania Route 611. Pennsylvania Route 309, a major north–south route connecting Northeastern Pennsylvania with the Delaware Valley region, passes through the western end of the region.

There are two U.S. Highways in the Pocono Mountains region. The more used is U.S. Route 209, which goes from Ulster, New York, to Millersburg, Pennsylvania (near Harrisburg). The route's midpoint is in the region north of Stroudsburg. It is designated a scenic route in Pennsylvania. U.S. Route 11, U.S. Route 22, and U.S. Route 46 are also not far from the region and serve it indirectly.

The main east–west interstate highway in the region is Interstate 80, off which branches Interstate 380, which connects the Poconos to Scranton. The other interstate highways in the region in Interstate 476, the Pennsylvania Turnpike's Northeast Extension, which has interchanges near Lehighton (Mahoning Valley), Albrightsville (Route 903), and White Haven (Pocono), and Interstate 81, which serves as an alternate route for the much busier Interstate 87 and Interstate 95, particularly for travelers from Toronto, Syracuse, Binghamton and Montreal to Philadelphia, Baltimore, and Washington, D.C. Other interstates that serve the region are Interstate 84, which begins in Scranton and goes east to New England, and Interstate 78, by way of Route 33 or Route 309.

Restoration of passenger rail service
NJ Transit is rebuilding trackage on the Lackawanna Cut-Off route from Scranton through the Poconos to Hoboken, New Jersey. There is no estimated target year when the Lackawanna Cut-Off Restoration Project will be completed to the Poconos. The service would consist of nine trains per day in each direction. The NJ Transit board approved in April 2022 a $32.5 million contract for improving a tunnel and restoring track to part of the line between Blairstown, New Jersey and Port Morris Junction, New Jersey, a segment in which trackage had been removed in the 1980s. Until 1970, the Erie Lackawanna Railway operated long-distance trains through the Poconos to Buffalo and Chicago to the west, and Hoboken to the east, the last train being the Lake Cities.

Air travel
There are two airports that are located just outside the region: the Wilkes-Barre/Scranton International Airport and the Lehigh Valley International Airport.

Geography 

The Pocono Mountains is a defined area encompassing portions of Carbon, Monroe, Pike, and southern Wayne Counties in Pennsylvania. Some definitions also extend the Poconos to Lackawanna, Luzerne, eastern Schuylkill, and Susquehanna Counties. The Poconos are geologically part of the Allegheny Plateau, like the nearby Catskills.

The Delaware River flows through the Pocono Mountains and gives the region its name, from a Native American term roughly translating to "stream between two mountains". The Lehigh and Lackawaxen Rivers also flow through the region, totaling about 170 miles (270 km) of waterways.

Climate

Glaciated Low Plateau Region

According to the Trewartha climate classification system, the Glaciated Low Plateau region of the northern and eastern Poconos has a Temperate Continental climate (Dc) with warm summers (b), cold winters (o) and year-around precipitation (Dcbo). Dcbo climates are characterized by at least one month having an average mean temperature ≤ , four to seven months with an average mean temperature ≥ , all months with an average mean temperature <  and no significant precipitation difference between seasons. Although most summer days are comfortably humid on the Low Plateau, episodes of heat and high humidity can occur with heat index values > . July is the peak month for thunderstorm activity which correlates with the average warmest month of the year. The average snowiest month is January which correlates with the average coldest month of the year. Ice storms and large snowstorms depositing ≥  of snow occur nearly every year, particularly during nor’easters from December through March.

Glaciated Pocono Plateau Region

According to the Trewartha climate classification system, the Glaciated Pocono Plateau region of the central and western Poconos has a Temperate Continental climate (Dc) with warm summers (b), cold winters (o) and year-around precipitation (Dcbo). Dcbo climates are characterized by at least one month having an average mean temperature ≤ , four to seven months with an average mean temperature ≥ , all months with an average mean temperature <  and no significant precipitation difference between seasons. Although most summer days are comfortably humid on the Pocono Plateau, episodes of heat and high humidity can occur with heat index values > . July is the peak month for thunderstorm activity which correlates with the average warmest month of the year. Episodes of extreme cold and wind can occur with wind chill values < . The average snowiest month is January which correlates with the average coldest month of the year. Ice storms and large snowstorms depositing ≥  of snow occur nearly every year, particularly during nor’easters from December through March.

Ridge and Valley Region

According to the Trewartha climate classification system, the Ridge and Valley section of the southern Poconos has a Temperate Continental climate (Dc) with hot summers (a), cold winters (o) and year-around precipitation (Dcao). Dcao climates are characterized by at least one month having an average mean temperature ≤ , four to seven months with an average mean temperature ≥ , at least one month with an average mean temperature ≥  and no significant precipitation difference between seasons. Although most summer days are slightly humid in the Ridge and Valley, episodes of heat and high humidity can occur with heat index values > . July is the peak month for thunderstorm activity which correlates with the average warmest month of the year. The average wettest month is September which correlates with tropical storm remnants during the peak of the Atlantic hurricane season. Episodes of extreme cold and wind can occur with wind chill values < . The average snowiest month is January which correlates with the average coldest month of the year. Ice storms and large snowstorms depositing ≥  of snow occur once every couple of years, particularly during nor’easters from December through March.

Ecology

Glaciated Low Plateau Region

According to the A. W. Kuchler U.S. potential natural vegetation types, the Glaciated Low Plateau region of the northern and eastern Poconos would have a dominant vegetation type of Northern Hardwood (106) with a dominant vegetation form of Northern hardwood forest (26) north and west of Lake Wallenpaupack, and a dominant vegetation type of Appalachian Oak (104) with a dominant vegetation form of Eastern Hardwood Forest (25) south and east of Wallenpaupack. The peak spring bloom typically occurs in early-May and peak fall color usually occurs in early-October.

Glaciated Pocono Plateau Region

According to the A. W. Kuchler U.S. potential natural vegetation types, the Glaciated Pocono Plateau region of the central and western Poconos would have a dominant vegetation type of Northern Hardwood (106) with a dominant vegetation form of Northern hardwood forest (26). The peak spring bloom typically occurs in early-May and peak fall color usually occurs in early-October.

Ridge and Valley Region

According to the A. W. Kuchler U.S. potential natural vegetation types, the Ridge and Valley region of the southern Poconos would have a dominant vegetation type of Appalachian Oak (104) with a dominant vegetation form of Eastern Hardwood Forest (25). The peak spring bloom typically occurs in late-April and peak fall color usually occurs in mid-October.

Sullivan March

During the Revolutionary War in 1779, General John Sullivan marched his troops through the Pocono Mountains (Monroe and Luzerne counties) on their expedition to fight the Iroquois tribe in New York State.  Sergeant Moses Fellows of the Third New Hampshire Regiment described the area as "...very poor & Barren and I think as never will Be Settled.”

Recreation

The Poconos are a well-known outdoor recreation destination for visitors around the northeast, especially from New York City and Philadelphia. The region encompasses the Delaware State Forest, including six designated natural areas, seven state parks, and seventeen state game lands.  The Delaware Water Gap National Recreation Area is on the eastern edge of the Poconos and includes  of wilderness.

Resorts

Two of the earliest Pocono resorts were founded by rival factions of the Philadelphia Quaker community, Inn at Buck Hill Falls (1901) and Pocono Manor (1902).  These resorts did not allow liquor or dancing, and evening dress was discouraged.  The Quakers "brought a quiet, unostentatious style to the region," but their hotels later developed from religious retreats into "luxurious mountain resorts."  Buck Hill's stone facade became a model for close to 300 stately stone-and-shingle homes in the region.  Pocono Manor offered sweeping vistas of the eastern and western Pocono region and had been referred to as the "Grand Lady of the Mountains."  Buck Hill closed in 1990 and the Inn at Pocono Manor was mostly destroyed by fire in 2019.

Skytop Lodge, built in 1928, is described as a "Dutch Colonial-style manor house." Designed in reaction to the Quaker resorts, it had a dance floor and served liquor in a basement bar. Novelist Faith Baldwin wrote about her 1932 visit to Skytop, "Here are friendly mountains, round-breasted, smiling in the clear, rosy light of dawn."

The Buckwood Inn opened in 1911 and included the first golf course to be designed by renowned golf architect A. W. Tillinghast.  Bandleader Fred Waring purchased the resort in 1943, renamed it the Shawnee Inn, and broadcast his radio shows from there.  The Shawnee Inn is a Spanish colonial revival building with white-Moorish architecture and Spanish tiled roofs, and it was identified in the 1990s as the only resort on the banks of the Delaware River.

Tamiment was a popular resort among Jewish singles from the working and emerging middle class and has been described as "a progressive version of the Catskills..." The  facility opened in 1921 to generate income for the Rand School of Social Science, a Socialist school in New York. Tamiment Playhouse entertained resort guests with an original revue every Saturday night during the 10-week summer season, and many prominent Broadway and TV figures gained experience there. The playhouse was referred to as the "Poconos boot camp for Broadway writers and performers." The revues were discontinued in 1960 and the resort closed down in 2005.

Unity House, a  Pocono retreat, offered affordable vacations for factory workers. The resort was owned for seventy years by the International Ladies' Garment Workers' Union, and it served as a staging ground for union activities. Ron Devlin of The Morning Call referred to Unity House as a "blue-collar 'Hilton.'" Eleanor Roosevelt visited Unity House many times and wrote, "...you could not put children in a more favorable environment..." The resort closed down in 1990, falling victim to changing times and declining union membership.

In 1945 retired New York executive Rudolf Van Hoevenberg established the first honeymoon resort in the Pocono Mountains, Farm on the Hill.  Sally Moore of Snow Country wrote, "Far from today's sybaritic accommodations, back then the rustic cabins required new brides to make the beds and tidy up while grooms helped with the dishes and did the heavy work."  By 1960, the Pocono Mountains rivaled Niagara Falls as a honeymoon destination, attracting 100,000 couples a year. Morris Wilkins, co-owner of Cove Haven, invented the heart-shaped bathtub in 1963 as a way to lure honeymoon customers. The tub would appear in other couples resorts and became a symbol of the Pocono resort business.  Author Lawrence Squeri wrote in 2002, "If Americans today are asked to name the image that best represents the Poconos, chances are that many will cite couples resorts and heart-shaped bathtubs..."

Mount Airy Lodge expanded from an eight-room inn into the largest Pocono resort.  It heavily advertised in the New York media market with the catchy jingle, "Beautiful Mount Airy Lodge."  Headliners, such as Bob Hope, Milton Berle, and Connie Francis, performed in the Crystal Room, Mount Airy's 2,000-seat theater.  Comedian Mickey Freeman said, "The food was lousy, but it was a legalized orgy."  The  resort's heyday was in the 1960s and 1970s before closing in 2001.

In the 1950s the Kiesendahl family purchased a 12-bedroom boarding house along Lake Teedyuskung.  It became the Woodloch Resort and, as of 2014, it encompassed  and accommodated 900 guests in a variety of lodgings. Travel + Leisure identified the Lodge at Woodloch (founded 2006) as the number 3 destination spa in the world.

As of July 2015, there were four Pocono resorts with indoor water parks: Great Wolf Lodge, H20ooohh! at Split Rock Resort, Aquatopia at Camelback Mountain Resort, and Kalahari Resort.  In 2014 Jayne Clark of USA Today wrote, "The former Honeymoon Capital of the World, the Poconos – rebranded in 2007 as the Pocono Mountains – continues to fine-tune its image as a family-friendly outdoor adventureland, health spa getaway and emerging waterpark capital."

Gambling
In November 2006 the Pocono Downs (now Mohegan Pennsylvania) harness-racing complex opened the first slot-machine parlor in the state of Pennsylvania.  It was owned by the Mohegan Indian Tribe of Connecticut and included two gambling floors with nearly 1,100 machines.  The Mount Airy Casino Resort opened in October 2007 (on the site of the former Mount Airy Lodge) with about 2,500 slot machines.  The owner, Louis DeNaples, was later charged with perjury due to suspected ties with organized crime figures.  He turned the resort over to his daughter and avoided prosecution.

Camping
The Poconos are home to several Scout camps. Other Scout camps located in the Poconos include Goose Pond Scout Reservation (Lake Ariel), Resica Falls Scout Reservation (Marshalls Creek), and Trexler Scout Reservation (Jonas).

The Poconos are also home to several Jewish summer camps, including Camp Massad, Camp Ramah, and Pinemere Camp.  Other non-denominational season summer camps include Camp Lohikan, Camp Watonka, and Pocono Springs Camp.

Racing

Pocono Raceway, a major automobile race track, is home to a NASCAR Cup Series race, the Pocono 400, in July. The track formerly hosted a second NASCAR Cup Series race, the Pocono 325, and an IndyCar race, the Pocono 500. It also serves as a racing school, motorcycle track, and hosts club events. The two NASCAR weekends at Pocono are vital to the region for the tourism money it brings to the local economy. Pocono Raceway is the closest major professional race track to Philadelphia and the major metropolitan areas of New York and New Jersey.

Skiing 

Skiing was a $230 million a year industry in the Poconos and in 1987 accounted for one-quarter of the region's tourist business.  Pennsylvania native John Guresh, an employee at Big Boulder Ski Resort, is credited for bringing the ski industry to the Poconos.  In the winter of 1956–57 he invented a machine "resembling a lawn sprinkler atop a sled" to generate artificial snow.  Joyce Gemperlein of The Philadelphia Inquirer wrote, "Until Guresh perfected snowmaking at Big Boulder, skiing in the Poconos was a relatively minor sport."  Ski resorts in the region could not rely on natural snow and, according to Big Boulder manager Ken Knize, there were times when conditions were right for skiing only two weeks a year.  Cal Conniff, president of the National Ski Areas Association, regarded Guresh as "one of the pioneers" of the U.S. ski industry.

 Alpine Mountain - now closed.
 Jack Frost Mountain and Big Boulder — Both resorts are owned by the same parent company. Jack Frost caters to more traditional family skiing, while Big Boulder is largely focused on terrain park skiing and snowboarding.
 Montage Mountain Ski Resort — formerly known as "Snö Mountain".
 Shawnee Mountain Ski Area — closest to New York City, just across the Delaware River from New Jersey, suited for families and beginners.
 Ski Big Bear

Notable natives and residents 

Fethullah Gülen, Turkish cleric in self-imposed exile
 Robert E. Kintner, ex-President of both ABC and NBC
 S. S. Kresge, founder of Kmart, formerly, SS Kresge's
 Byron Lichtenberg, American engineer and fighter pilot who flew aboard two NASA Space Shuttle missions as a Payload Specialist.
 Kelly Monaco, actress and winner of the first season of Dancing with the Stars
 Rob Felicetti, bassist in alternative rock/pop punk band Bowling For Soup.
 James Mungro, former NFL running back and Super Bowl Champion with the Indianapolis Colts
 Paul Sorvino, actor and opera singer.
 Morris Wilkins, inventor of the heart-shaped bathtub and champagne glass bathtub

Media

Print
The Pocono Record is the newspaper for the Poconos. Its coverage area centers on Stroudsburg and East Stroudsburg and covers parts of Monroe, Pike, Lackawanna, Luzerne, Wayne and Carbon counties as well as areas of western New Jersey.

The Times News, of Lehighton, covers Carbon, Schuylkill, and Monroe counties, and also portions of northern Lehigh and Northampton counties.

West End Happenings covers events in the West End of Monroe County.

The Morning Call, of Allentown, is distributed to a sizeable portion of the region, especially southern Carbon, southern Monroe, and southeastern Schuylkill counties, though its coverage is mostly centered on the neighboring Lehigh Valley. A similar situation occurs with the Times-Tribune of the Scranton/Wilkes-Barre area and northern Monroe, northern Carbon, and Luzerne counties.

The Standard-Speaker, of Hazleton, covers parts of Luzerne, Carbon, Monroe, and Schuylkill counties.

Blue Mountain Moments is a monthly publication covering the Route 903 corridor from Blakeslee to Jim Thorpe.

Radio
WESS at (90.3 FM) broadcasts from the Borough of East Stroudsburg as a service of East Stroudsburg University. Students and faculty of the university provide programing often, and the station rebroadcasts BBC World Service when live DJs are not available.
WKRZ (98.5 FM/107.9 FM) is a radio station broadcasting a contemporary hits radio format. The station's call letters are WKRF-FM and is licensed to Tobyhanna and simulcasts WKRZ-FM (98.5 FM from Wilkes Barre) on 107.9 FM.
WPCO (840 AM; "Pocono 103.1") is licensed to Stroudsburg. The station's slogan is "The Poconos' Greatest Hits"; they primarily play music from the 1960s to the 1990s.
WVPO "Bigfoot Country 96.7" is licensed to Lehman Township in Pike County. The station plays country music.
WSBG (93.5 FM) is a radio station broadcasting an adult contemporary format. Licensed to Stroudsburg, the station serves the Pocono area with the slogan "The Poconos' Best Variety".

References

External links

Pocono Mountains Visitors Bureau

 
Mountain ranges of Pennsylvania
Subranges of the Appalachian Mountains
Allegheny Plateau
Landforms of Carbon County, Pennsylvania
Landforms of Lackawanna County, Pennsylvania
Landforms of Luzerne County, Pennsylvania
Landforms of Monroe County, Pennsylvania
Landforms of Pike County, Pennsylvania
Landforms of Schuylkill County, Pennsylvania
Landforms of Susquehanna County, Pennsylvania
Landforms of Wayne County, Pennsylvania
Regions of Pennsylvania